César Antonio Chávez Castillo (born 31 December 1951) is a Mexican politician affiliated with the Party of the Democratic Revolution. As of 2014 he served as Deputy of the LVI and LIX Legislatures of the Mexican Congress as a plurinominal representative.

References

1951 births
Living people
Politicians from Mexico City
Members of the Chamber of Deputies (Mexico)
Party of the Democratic Revolution politicians
20th-century Mexican politicians
21st-century Mexican politicians
National Autonomous University of Mexico alumni
Academic staff of the National Autonomous University of Mexico
Deputies of the LIX Legislature of Mexico